Attitude (stylised in all lowercase) is a British gay lifestyle magazine owned by Stream Publishing Limited. It is sold worldwide as a physical magazine, and as a digital download for the iPad and iPhone via the App Store, and for Android devices via the Google Play Store. The first issue of Attitude appeared in May 1994. A separate Thai edition was published from March 2011 to April 2018, a Vietnamese edition launched in November 2013, and editions in Belgium and the Netherlands launched in February 2017.

History of ownership

Attitude began publication in 1994 as part of the Northern and Shell Group owned by Richard Desmond, and having been through a succession of owners subsequent to its sale in 2004 (commensurate with Desmond's takeover of Express Newspapers) it was acquired in September 2016 by contract publisher Stream Publishing. The owner of Stream Publishing, Darren Styles, had previously launched the successful Attitude Awards for the brand (in October 2012) and acquired the English-language rights to Winq, the luxury lifestyle magazine for gay men, from its Amsterdam-based owner (the Media Mansion) in August 2013.

Content
Celebrities who have appeared on the cover include Prince William, Boy George, Madonna, David Beckham, Michael Sam, Lady Gaga,  Tom Daley and Matty Lee, RuPaul, Tom Hardy, Jonathan Bailey, Gareth Thomas, Ian Somerhalder, John Grant, Mark Wahlberg, Jonathan Groff, Andrew Scott, Tony Blair, Daniel Radcliffe, Heath Ledger, Sacha Baron Cohen as Brüno Gehard, David Cameron, Ed Miliband, Robbie Rogers, the Spice Girls, Take That, James Franco, Dominic Cooper, James Anderson, Nick Jonas, Jussie Smollett with Naomi Campbell, Mark Feehily, Kevin McDaid, Kylie Minogue, Marilyn Manson, Elton John, McFly, Nicola Adams, Robbie Williams, Rupert Everett, Justin Timberlake, Philip Olivier, Freddie Ljungberg, Marina and the Diamonds, George Michael, Rufus Wainwright, Will Young, Harry Judd of McFly, Christina Aguilera, Dermot O'Leary, John Barrowman, Gary Lucy, Beth Ditto, Cheyenne Jackson, Scissor Sisters, Adam Lambert and Liam Payne. Many of these covers have been world exclusives. Attitude published a cover featuring Alan Turing in October 13 as part of its 'Attitude Awards' edition.

Tony Blair gave the first interview a serving Prime Minister has ever given a gay publication in May 2005. He gave his second ever gay press interview to mark Attitude'''s 15th birthday in May 2009.

In February 2010, former Conservative party leader David Cameron appeared on the cover of Attitude giving his first interview to a gay publication.

For the August 2009 issue, Harry Potter star Daniel Radcliffe gave his first interview to a gay publication in which he announced his support for British political party the Liberal Democrats. He said, "I just loathe homophobia. It's just disgusting and animal and stupid and it's just thick people who can't get their heads around it and are just scared. I grew up around gay people entirely. I was the only child in my class who had any experience of homosexuality or anything like that."

In addition to celebrity interviews the magazine also includes serious features on a range of subjects, which have included the plight of gay asylum seekers and the rise of the far Right in Eastern Europe, the US presidential election campaign as well as real life editorial such as male rape and body image issues. In May 2005, on the eve of the UK general election, the magazine interviewed Tony Blair for the cover. In April 2008, Attitude took then Mayor of London Boris Johnson to task about his comments that "if gay marriage was okay – and I was uncertain of that issue – then I saw no reason why a union should not therefore be consecrated between three men, as well as two men; or indeed three men and a dog", a claim Johnson tried to justify as loose talk on Newsnight or Question Time, until reminded of a passage in his own book as a direct source.Attitude frequently acquires exclusive interviews within the gay market. These exclusives include Daniel Radcliffe's only gay press interview, Madonna's first worldwide press interview for her Confessions on a Dance Floor album, Elton John and David Furnish's only print interview for their civil partnership in December 2005, Heath Ledger's only gay press interview, Take That's first print interview after re-forming, Kylie Minogue, who always gives Attitude her launch interviews and Robbie Williams's only cover story interview on the release of his Greatest Hits album. Will Young has only ever given gay press interviews to Attitude. In 2006, The Scissor Sisters gave their first print interview for their new album to the magazine with an exclusive five cover edition, each cover featuring a different member of the band. Take That also gave their first magazine interview to Attitude after reforming and also posed for a four cover special in early 2009.

The magazine is often themed, notably with a celebrity naked issue which featured amongst others Max Beesley, Philip Olivier and Will Mellor. In July 2005 the magazine launched fashion supplements as a spin-off publication. The March 2010 issue was themed as the titles first Older Issue with EastEnders star John Partridge on the cover. The February 2017 edition was the first Body Issue.

Contributors to the magazine have included Julie Burchill, David Furnish, Mark Simpson (the magazine's leading columnist in its early years), Tim Teeman, Simon Fanshawe, Will Self, Augusten Burroughs, Andrew M. Potts, Anthony Crank, Jackie Collins, Matt Lucas, Boy George, Russell T Davies, Graham Norton, Preston from the Ordinary Boys, Bruce LaBruce and photographer Wolfgang Tillmans.

In a 2009 interview, Blair questioned the Pope's attitude towards homosexuality, arguing that religious leaders must start "rethinking" the issue.

In a 2016, Prince William, Duke of Cambridge was photographed exclusively for the cover of Attitude , marking the very first time a member of the British Royal Family had posed for on appeared on or in a gay magazine. Inside, the Prince met nine LGBT people who had experienced homo, bi or transphobic abuse growing up and had suffered mental health problems as a result. The issue made headlines all over the world on news and television media including BBC, NBC, ITN, Sky News and many more.

Cover starsAttitude features a mixture of gay and straight cover stars. , Attitude had published 280 issues with more than 300 covers. More than half of the cover stars have been gay. The longest stretch straight celebrities have not appeared on the cover is three months. Then-Editor Matthew Todd previously suggested there were not enough famous gay people to have them on the cover constantly and has made a point of putting celebrities on the cover such as Beth Ditto (first lesbian woman on an Attitude cover) and Kele Okereke (first black gay man on an Attitude cover).

In 2016, Prince William became the first member of the British royal family to appear on the cover of a gay magazine when he appeared on the cover of the July issue of Attitude; in the cover story, he also became the first British royal to openly condemn the bullying of the gay community.

In the January 2020 issue, Yasmin Benoit and Anick Soni became the first asexual and intersex people on cover of Attitude respectively.

Achievements

In 2005, former editor Adam Mattera won Best Men's Magazine editor of the year at the BSME awards. It was the first time that a gay magazine editor won the prize. Mattera was short-listed again for the prize in 2006. In April 2008, Attitude's  fashion director was named in The Times as one of the UK's top 20 star-makers for his contribution to the music industry, alongside Simon Cowell. Attitude was later edited by Matthew Todd, a long-time associate editor and former deputy editor and writer of the play Blowing Whistles. Todd was nominated as Best Men's Magazine Editor of the Year at the BSME awards 2009 and 2010, the only gay magazine to have been nominated. He went on to win the award in 2011 and 2015 and won BSME Scoop of the Year in 2016 for his Prince William edition. Todd left in 2016 on publication of his book Straight Jacket: How to be gay and happy, about LGBT mental health, something he began writing about in Attitude in 2010.

The digital edition of Attitude had a circulation of 9,966 for the period of July–December 2013 according to ABC. None of the gay titles reveal print ABC figures (although Bent used to, placing its readership at 42,347 when it was last audited by ABC in 2004) but Press Gazette has named Attitude as the biggest-selling in the sector.

International editions

 Thai Edition 
GMM Inter Publishing began publishing the Thai edition of Attitude in March 2011. It featured Thailand's top celebrities including Ananda Everingham, Mario Maurer, Nadech Kugimiya, Utt Panichkul and Jiho Lee. The edition gave an advent of the local specific column Straight Guy We Love by the renowned Thai photographer Haruehun Airry. Being featured on Straight Guy We Love often extended further career in fashion industry for models until the photographer quit working for the column in early 2013. The magazine ceased publication with the April 2018 edition.

 Attitude Vietnam:  
Based in Ho Chi Minh City, and published monthly by Thanh Nien Publishing House in association with Skyharp Media & Entertainment Co. Ltd, Vietnamese edition of Attitude'' was released in Vietnam on 25 November 2013. This edition focuses on supporting on gay rights movement and raising awareness among people.

References

Further reading

External links

Attitude Thai
Attitude Vietnam

Gay men's magazines published in the United Kingdom
Bi-monthly magazines published in the United Kingdom
Magazines established in 1994
1994 establishments in the United Kingdom
Magazines published in London